The American Translators Association (ATA) is the largest professional association of translators and interpreters in the United States with nearly 8,500 members in more than 100 countries.

Founded in 1959, membership is open to anyone with an interest in translation and interpreting as a profession or as a scholarly pursuit. Members include translators, interpreters, educators, project managers, web and software developers, language services companies, hospitals, universities, and government agencies.

ATA offers certification examinations for its members in some language combinations and is affiliated with the International Federation of Translators (FIT). The association is headquartered in Alexandria, Virginia.

Unlike a trade union, the ATA represents both "labor" and "management"—that is, both the independent contractors who produce translation and interpreting services and the  agencies who purchase them. The ATA likewise does not provide union-type benefits, such as collective bargaining or health insurance, to its freelance members.

Professional development
ATA's primary goals are to foster and support the professional development of translators and interpreters and to promote the translation and interpreting professions. The Association offers a variety of programs and services in support of these goals, including webinars and one-day workshops throughout the year and an ATA Annual Conference every fall—all of which feature translation and interpreting education in diverse specialties and languages.

Certification
The ATA currently offers certification exams in the following language pairs:

Into English from Arabic, Chinese, Croatian, Danish, Dutch, French, German, Italian, Japanese, Polish, Portuguese, Russian, Spanish, Swedish, and Ukrainian.

From English into Arabic, Chinese, Croatian, Dutch, Finnish, French, German, Hungarian, Italian, Japanese, Polish, Portuguese, Romanian, Russian, Spanish, Swedish, and Ukrainian.

After passing the ATA certification examination, translators are required to complete a certain number of "continuing education" points in order to retain their certification.

Advocacy
ATA is a member of the Joint National Committee for Languages, a nonprofit education policy association that works to raise grassroots awareness of the importance of languages to national security, economic growth, and social justice. ATA has also advocated for translators and interpreters on specific issues affecting the translation and interpreting professions. See ATA Statement Opposing Discontinuing Immigration Interpreting Services, ATA Opposes Lower Interpreter Exam Scores in Texas, and  ATA Position Statement Regarding California Assembly Bill 5 and Request for Exemption.

International Translation Day
Since 2018, ATA has celebrated International Translation Day (September 30) by publishing a series of social media posts intended to educate the public about the role of professional translators and interpreters. ATA's 2018 ITD celebration centered on six infographics highlighting "need to know" facts about translation and interpreting services. On September 30, the Association will release a "Day in the Life of a Translator or Interpreter," a short animated video showing how translators and interpreters help power the global economy.

Governance
ATA is governed by its Bylaws, and has a President, a President-Elect, a Secretary, a Treasurer, and a nine-member Board of Directors. An Executive Director is in charge of operations.

Current officers
 Madalena Sánchez Zampaulo, President
 Veronika Demichelis, President-Elect
 Alaina Brandt, Secretary
 John M. Milan, Treasurer

Past presidents

 1960–1963 Alexander Gode
 1963–1965 Kurt Gingold
 1965–1967 Henry Fischbach
 1967–1969 Boris Anzlowar
 1969–1970 Daniel Peter Moynihan (Resigned in June 1970)
 1970–1971 William I. Bertsche (Completed Moynihan's term)
 1971–1973 Thomas Wilds
 1973–1975 William I. Bertsche
 1975–1977 Roy Tinsley
 1977–1979 Josephine Thornton
 1979–1981 Thomas R. Bauman
 1981–1983 Benjamin Teague
 1983–1985 Virginia Eva Berry
 1985–1987 Patricia E. Newman
 1987–1989 Karl Kummer
 1989–1991 Deanna L. Hammond
 1991–1993 Leslie Wilson
 1993–1995 Edith F. Losa
 1995–1997 Peter W. Krawutschke
 1997–1999 Muriel M. Jérôme-O'Keeffe
 1999–2001 Ann G. Macfarlane
 2001–2003 Thomas L. West III
 2003–2005 Scott Brennan
 2005–2007 Marian S. Greenfield
 2007–2009 Jiri Stejskal
 2009–2011 Nicholas Hartmann
 2011–2013 Dorothee Racette
 2013–2015 Caitilin Walsh
 2015–2017 David Rumsey
 2017–2019 Corinne L. McKay

Publications
 The ATA Chronicle is a monthly publication available 'online' and in hard-copy format. The publication includes articles on various translation- and interpreting-related issues combined with regular features.
 ATA Newsbriefs is an e-newsletter distributed to members twice a month. The publication features national and international news about translation and interpreting. 
 ATA Translation and Interpreting Compensation Survey is an industry-wide survey providing a comprehensive picture of the market for T&I services. The full report is free to ATA members. An Executive Summary is available at no cost to non-members.
 The ATA Compass is a free e-publication for buyers of translation and interpreting services.
 Translation: Getting it Right
 Interpreting: Getting it Right
 ATA Scholarly Monograph Series—Published annually by John Benjamins.

Structure
ATA divisions provide members with common interests a way to network and receive career updates. The divisions offer newsletters, online forums, seminars, conference presentations, and networking sessions. ATA offers 22 special interest groups or divisions, based on language or subject-area specialty. Any member of the ATA can belong to any division(s).
 Arabic Language Division
 Audiovisual Division
 Chinese Language Division
 Dutch Language Division
 Educators Division
 French Language Division
 German Language Division
 Government Division
 Interpreters Division
 Italian Language Division
 Japanese Language Division
 Korean Language Division
 Language Technology Division
 Law Division
 Literary Division
 Medical Division
 Nordic Division
 Portuguese Language Division
 Science and Technology Division
 Slavic Languages Division
 Spanish Language Division
 Translation Company Division

ATA chapters
ATA chapters and affiliates provide regional information, marketing, networking, and support services to local translators and interpreters.
 Association of Translators and Interpreters of Florida (ATIF)
 Atlanta Association of Interpreters and Translators (AAIT)
 Carolina Association of Interpreters and Translators (CATI)
 Colorado Translators Association (CTA)
 Delaware Valley Translators Association (DVTA)
 Michigan Translators/Interpreters Network (MiTiN)
 Mid-America Chapter of ATA (MICATA)
 Midwest Association of Translators and Interpreters (MATI)
 National Capital Area Chapter of the ATA (NCATA)
 New York Circle of Translators (NYCT)
 Northeast Ohio Translators Association (NOTA)
 Northern California Translators Association (NCTA)
 Northwest Translators and Interpreters Society (NOTIS)
 Upper Midwest Translators and Interpreters Association (UMTIA)

Affiliated groups
 Association of Translators and Interpreters in the San Diego Area (ATISDA)
 Austin Area Translators and Interpreters Association (AATIA)
 El Paso Interpreters and Translators Association (EPITA)
 Houston Interpreters and Translators Association (HITA)
 Iowa Interpreters and Translators Association (IITA)
 Nebraska Association of Translators and Interpreters (NATI)
 Nevada Interpreters and Translators Association (NITA)
 New Mexico Translators and Interpreters Association (NMTIA)
 Oregon Society of Translators and Interpreters (OSTI)
 Tennessee Association of Professional Interpreters and Translators (TAPIT)
 Utah Translators and Interpreters Association (UTIA)

See also
List of translators and interpreters associations

References

External links
 American Translators Association (ATA)
 ATA Chronicle Online

Professional associations based in the United States
Translation associations of the United States
Organizations based in Alexandria, Virginia
1959 establishments in the United States
Organizations established in 1959